The 1986 Ohio Valley Conference men's basketball tournament was the final event of the 1985–86 season in the Ohio Valley Conference. The tournament was held March 3–5, 1986, at James A. Rhodes Arena in Akron, Ohio.

Akron defeated  in the championship game, 68–63, to win their first OVC men's basketball tournament.

The Zips received an automatic bid to the 1986 NCAA tournament as the No. 15 seed in the Midwest region.

Bracket

References

Ohio Valley Conference men's basketball tournament
Tournament
Ohio Valley Conference men's basketball tournament
Ohio Valley Conference men's basketball tournament